James Aldous (7 August 1882 – 31 January 1975) was a British diver. He competed in the men's 10 metre platform event at the 1908 Summer Olympics.

References

1882 births
1975 deaths
British male divers
Olympic divers of Great Britain
Divers at the 1908 Summer Olympics
Sportspeople from London